Garmkhan Rural District is a rural district (dehestan) in Garmkhan District, Bojnord County, North Khorasan Province, Iran. At the 2006 census, its population was 28,259, in 6,676 families.  The rural district has 37 villages.

References 

Rural Districts of North Khorasan Province
Bojnord County